Pol Mahieu (1944 - 2022) is a Belgian racing cyclist. He rode in the 1969 Tour de France.

References

1944 births
Living people
Belgian male cyclists
Place of birth missing (living people)